Maria Pia Concepcion Nieva Arcangel-Halili (born December 8, 1978), is a Filipino television newscaster and journalist in the Philippines.

Career
Arcangel started as a courtside reporter for the UAAP basketball games aired over Studio 23 (now ABS-CBN Sports and Action).  In 2003, she became one of the hosts of the morning show Unang Hirit of GMA Network.  She also hosted the children's show Art Angel with Tonipet Gaba and Krystal Reyes where she along with his co-hosts won awards during the 21st, 22nd and 23rd PMPC Star Awards for Television as Best Children Show Hosts. In QTV/Q (now GMA News TV, then GTV), she co-anchored Balitanghali with Raffy Tima for 9 years until Connie Sison permanently replaced her since November 10, 2014.

She is currently a co-anchor of 24 Oras Weekend and Saksi.

Personal life
Arcangel is the daughter of Clotilde Arcangel, Dean of the UST College of Education.

She finished high school at Assumption Antipolo and graduated with a Bachelor of Arts degree in Communication Arts from the Ateneo de Manila University in 2000.

Arcangel is married to sportscaster, Mico Halili since 2004.

References

External links
 

1978 births
Living people
Ateneo de Manila University alumni
Filipino television news anchors
GMA Network personalities
GMA Integrated News and Public Affairs people